The term T-wave may refer to:

 T wave, a portion of the recording of a heartbeat in an electrocardiogram
 Terahertz radiation, electromagnetic radiation in the microwave band
 T wave (seismic), a form of seismic wave